State Trunk Highway 80 (abbreviated as Highway 80, STH-80 or WIS 80) is a state highway in the U.S. state of Wisconsin. It runs north–south in southwest and west central Wisconsin from just south of Marshfield, near the geographic center of the state to the Illinois border near Hazel Green.

Route description

South from Pittsville, the terrain is flat as WIS 80 passes along the Necedah National Wildlife Refuge, through the center of Necedah, and into New Lisbon just past the junction with Interstate 90/Interstate 94 (I-90/I-94). South of New Lisbon, it enters the Driftless Area with many rolling hills and curves. WIS 80 meets up with WIS 82 heading into Elroy, southern trailhead of the Elroy-Sparta Trail, and then to Union Center where WIS 33 also runs concurrently into Hillsboro. At Hillsboro, WIS 33/WIS 82 heads west and WIS 80 continues south into Richland County, through Hub City and into Richland Center.

WIS 80 crosses the Wisconsin River into Muscoda, which bills itself as the "Morel mushroom capital of Wisconsin". WIS 133 joins WIS 80 east  before WIS 80 heads south again to Highland and Cobb, where the land continues to be hilly but becomes less forested and more rolling farmland. At Cobb, WIS 80 follows US 18 west for  before heading south along the Iowa–Grant county line past Livingston and into Platteville, where it meets WIS 81 in town and US 151 south of town at the freeway bypass. South of Platteville, WIS 80 occasionally aligns itself along the Grant–Lafayette county line as it heads through Cuba City and Hazel Green, where WIS 11 joins for a few miles.

Major intersections

See also

References

External links

Wisconsin Highways: Highways 80 through 89
StateTrunkTour.com, Wisconsin Highway 80

080
Transportation in Grant County, Wisconsin
Transportation in Iowa County, Wisconsin
Transportation in Richland County, Wisconsin
Transportation in Vernon County, Wisconsin
Transportation in Juneau County, Wisconsin
Transportation in Wood County, Wisconsin